NFL Blitz Pro is a video game developed and published by Midway Games for GameCube, PlayStation 2 and Xbox in 2003.

Production

Reception

The game received "average" reviews on all platforms according to the review aggregation website Metacritic.

The game sold about 130,000 copies.

References

External links
 

2003 video games
American football video games
GameCube games
North America-exclusive video games
PlayStation 2 games
Xbox games
Video games developed in the United States